Blood & Orchids is a 1986 made-for-TV crime-drama film.  Written for the screen by Norman Katkov, it was an adaptation of Katkov's own novel which, in turn, was inspired by the 1932 Massie Trial in Honolulu, Hawaii. It was typical of many crime dramas produced during the period.

Plot 
In 1937 Hawaii, four native Hawaiian men find a white woman, beaten nearly to death, and take her to a hospital—only to be charged later with her rape and assault. During their trial, the woman's husband, a lieutenant in the US Navy, fatally shoots one of them and later stands trial himself. The trial brings into stark relief the racial tensions that tear at the social fabric of Territorial Hawaii in the years prior to World War II.

Socialite Hester Ashley Murdoch (Madeleine Stowe) leaves an officers' dinner party at the US Naval base in Honolulu in the company of a man who is not her husband (Lieutenant Lloyd Murdoch, played by William Russ), but rather Lt. Murdoch's best friend. The friend coldly announces that he is terminating their relationship, though Hester is carrying his child. Outraged, she announces that she will tell her husband and the commanding admiral on the station. In retaliation, the friend beats her savagely and leaves her bloodied and battered where she lies.

Four young Hawaiian men find her and take her to a hospital, although they fear being blamed for the condition she is in because she is haole (white) and they are native Hawaiian. At the hospital, Hester's mother Doris (Jane Alexander) assumes that the Hawaiians are to blame, but Hester says, "It's nobody's fault; I was the pregnant one!" The shocked Doris tells her daughter that she must collaborate in Doris' campaign to blame the Hawaiians, saying that Hester must think of Doris' "position" in high society. Accordingly, the four are charged with rape and assault, although the only sexual intercourse that Hester had was consensual and not with any of the four.

Most of the law-enforcement officers involved, including the Honolulu Police Department and the Navy Shore Patrol, assume that the Hawaiians are guilty, but Detective Captain Curt Maddox (Kris Kristofferson) is unconvinced. Meanwhile, the Hawaiians get a court-appointed attorney who strives valiantly to show that the four must be innocent of the crime, because of time-line conflicts with the best estimate of when the beating took place.
The trial of the four ends abruptly and tragically, though, when Lieutenant Murdoch, at the height of an at-the-bench discussion between the judge and the two opposing counsels, abruptly draws his service automatic and shoots the lead defendant twice in the head, killing him.

Now Murdoch must stand trial (in a civilian court) for murder in the first degree. Doris sends a wire to famed criminal attorney Walter Bergmann (Jose Ferrer), who agrees to defend Lieutenant Murdoch against the murder charge. The pretrial investigation is complicated by an affair between Detective Maddox and Mr. Bergmann's wife Leonore (Sean Young).

The case is further complicated when a number of Navy petty officers, all friends of Murdoch, kidnap the three remaining Hawaiians, tie them in spread-eagle fashion to an improvised rack, and beat them to get them to confess to the original alleged rape and assault. In the course of that particular atrocity, the Navy men repeatedly use the expression "bilge", which (at least according to the film) is common Navy slang for useless information or known falsehood. The lawyer for the Hawaiians interviews the three, after they are brought to a hospital and unable to lie on their backs because of the severe beatings they have received. There, they finally blurt out, "They said, 'Bilge!'" This gives the lawyer the vital clues he needs. Maddox follows up the clues and has the three arrested.

Murdoch's trial climaxes with Attorney Bergmann trying to sum up by saying that Murdoch's action was excusable. "Those animals beat her!" he cries; then Hester, plagued by her conscience, blurts out, "They're innocent! They're innocent!" Although Bergmann roughly escorts her from the courtroom, the damage is done: Murdoch is convicted.

Subsequently, Doris engages in a behavior called "brazening it out". She hires an interior decorator to redecorate her home. In the middle of her interview with the decorator, Detective Maddox arrives with a warrant for the arrests of Doris and Hester. Hester, crushed, rushes to her bathroom and hangs herself from the shower head. Doris discovers Hester's dead body and cries out in anguish.  Whether that anguish is truly for losing her daughter or because this is the final shameful and devastating blow to her social position, the film leaves unresolved, perhaps deliberately so.

Cast 
 Kris Kristofferson as Detective Captain Curtis "Curt" Maddox, HPD
 Jane Alexander as Doris Ashley
 Sean Young as Leonore Bergmann (Walter Bergmann's wife)
 Jose Ferrer as Walter Bergmann, counsellor-at-law
 Susan Blakely as Marie Farrell
 David Clennon as Philip Murray
 George Coe as Dr. Lansing (who examines Hester)
 Richard Dysart as Harvey Koster
 Elizabeth Lindsey as Sarah
 Haunani Minne as Princess Luahine (presumably a member of the deposed royal house of Hawaii, she breaks her self-imposed isolation to take up the cause of the four Hawaiians who are so ill-used by the haole community)
 William Russ as Lieutenant Lloyd Murdoch USN
 James Saito as Halehone (the Hawaiian lawyer who represents the accused men)
 Matt Salinger as Bryce Parker
 Madeleine Stowe as Hester Ashley Murdoch (Lloyd's wife)
 Arthur Rosenberg as Sergeant Jack Keller
 Sandy McPeak as Rear Admiral Glenn Langon, USN, (the 14th Naval District commandant)

Reception 
This film was nominated for two awards, including one Emmy Award for costuming and an Artios Award for casting.

External links 

The Massie Case: Injustice and Courage (Honolulu Advertiser)
The Massie Affair at PBS' The American Experience

1986 television films
1986 films
1986 crime drama films
Adultery in films
American television films
American courtroom films
Crime films based on actual events
Drama films based on actual events
Films scored by Mark Snow
Films based on American novels
Films set in 1937
Films set in Hawaii
Films shot in Honolulu
Films about hoaxes
Films about the United States Navy
Films directed by Jerry Thorpe
1980s American films